The following are the national records in track and field in the United States. Some of the records are maintained by USA Track & Field (USATF). Outdoor times for track races between 200 meters to 10,000 meters are set on 400-meter unbanked tracks. Indoor marks are established on 200-meter tracks, banked or unbanked. Indoor tracks longer than 200 meters are considered "oversized" and times are not accepted for record purposes. Indoor sprint races (50 to 60 meters) are held on level straight-aways.

American athletes are successful on an international stage with many American records being at the same time world records.

Outdoor
Key:

+ = en route to a longer distance

A = affected by altitude

# = not officially ratified by IAAF

Mx = mark was made in a mixed race

X = annulled due to doping violation

a = not record eligible according to World Athletics rule 260.28, but are regarded by USATF as Noteworthy Performances/Road Bests

h = hand timing

OT = oversized track (> 200m in circumference)

Men

Olympic Events

Non-Olympic Track Events

Non-Olympic Road Events

Women

Olympic Events

Non-Olympic Track and Field Events

Non-Olympic Road Events

Mixed

Indoor

Men

Women

Notes

References
General
USATF: American Outdoor Records 13 February 2023 updated
USATF: American Indoor Records 13 February 2023 updated
Track and Field News: American records – Men Outdoor 24 February 2023
Track and Field News: American records – Women Outdoor 14 February 2023
Track and Field News: American records – Men Indoor 25 March 2022
Track and Field News: American records – Women Indoor 21 April 2022
Specific

External links
USA Track and Field official website
USATF American Records page
USATF American Records special page

National records in athletics (track and field)
Track and field in the United States
Track and field
track and field